The 2022 USC Trojans men's volleyball team represents the University of Southern California in the 2022 NCAA Division I & II men's volleyball season. The Trojans, led by seventh year head coach Jeff Nygaard, play their home games at Galen Center. The Trojans are members of the MPSF and were picked to finish fifth in the MPSF preseason poll.

Season highlights
Will be filled in as the season progresses.

Roster

Schedule
TV/Internet Streaming information:
All home games will be televised on Pac-12 Network or streamed on Pac-12+ USC. Most road games will also be streamed by the schools streaming service. The conference tournament will be streamed by FloVolleyball. 

 *-Indicates conference match. (#)-Indicates tournament seeding.
 Times listed are Pacific Time Zone.

Announcers for televised games

UC Santa Barbara: Max Kelton & Katie Spieler
UC Santa Barbara: Max Kelton & Katie Spieler
Princeton: Mark Beltran & Paul Duchesne
Erskine: Mark Beltran & Paul Duchesne
Penn State: Anne Marie Anderson
Ohio State: Denny Cline
UC Irvine: Brian Webber
UC Irvine: Rob Espero & Charlie Brande
UC San Diego: Brian Webber
Long Beach State: Matt Brown & Matt Prosser
UC Santa Barbara: Kevin Barnett
CSUN: Mark Beltran & Paul Duchesne
Pepperdine: Al Epstein
Pepperdine: Anne Marie Anderson
BYU: Mark Beltran & Paul Duchesne
BYU: Anne Marie Anderson
George Mason: Mark Beltran & Paul Duchesne
Vanguard: Mark Beltran & Paul Duchesne
Menlo: Mark Beltran & Paul Duchesne
Stanford: Ted Enberg
Stanford: Ted Enberg
UCLA: Anne Marie Anderson
UCLA: Anne Marie Anderson
Concordia Irvine: Mark Beltran & Paul Duchesne
Concordia Irvine: Kienan Dixon
Grand Canyon: Diana Johnson & Amanda Roche
Grand Canyon: Diana Johnson & Houston Boe
MPSF Quarterfinal- Concordia Irvine: Nick Koop
MPSF Semifinal- Pepperdine: Darren Preston

Rankings 

^The Media did not release a Pre-season poll.

References

2022 in sports in California
2022 NCAA Division I & II men's volleyball season
USC